Annie Creek is a stream in the U.S. state of South Dakota.

Annie Creek has the name of Annie Clark, the daughter of a pioneer settler.

See also
List of rivers of South Dakota

References

Rivers of Lawrence County, South Dakota
Rivers of South Dakota